Bishop Basil (born Yao Fu'an, or Yao Shuanglin, ; 23 December 1888 – 3 January 1962) was the bishop of the Chinese Orthodox Church, who served as bishop of Beijing.

Biography 
He was born in Beijing on December 23, 1888. He graduated from theological seminary at the Russian Orthodox Mission in Beijing, and was ordained to the diaconate on May 11, 1915, by Bishop Innocent (Figurovsky).

He served a deacon during 33 years. In 1948  was ordained to the priesthood. He was elevated to the rank of hegumen in 1948. In 1951, Patriarch Alexy I of Moscow consecrated him as bishop of Tianjin, however Yao did not accept the patriarch's consecration.

In May 1957, he was consecrated as bishop of Beijing. His service continued until the year of 1962 when he died in January of that year.

He was among the only two Chinese priests who became Orthodox bishops. The other was Bishop Symeon Du of Shanghai. After his death, no succeeding bishops were elected in Beijing. The position remains vacant.

References

Bishops of the Russian Orthodox Church
20th-century Eastern Orthodox priests
1888 births
1962 deaths
Eastern Orthodox Christians from China
Hegumens
Chinese people of Russian descent
People from Beijing